The Good Parts is the third studio album by American recording artist Andy Grammer, released on December 1, 2017, through BMG Rights Management and S-Curve Records. It includes the single "Fresh Eyes", which peaked at No. 59 on the Billboard Hot 100.

Background
In an interview with Billboard, Grammer confirmed that 115 songs had been written for the album, and that "This is the first time I'm going to release an album that all the way down in my deepest self - and as a people pleaser, this is a really crazy to say - I don't care if you like it. To actually believe that when I say that... what a different place to be at as a 33-year-old artist." He discussed the title track with PopCrush; "about sharing your true story with people and really wanting to get to the place where you could honestly share those unfiltered parts."

Track listing

Charts

References

2017 albums
Andy Grammer albums
S-Curve Records albums